Remote computing may refer to:

 Remote desktop software
 Cloud computing